Dorcadion crassipes is a species of beetle in the family Cerambycidae. It was described Ballion by 1878.

Subspecies
 Dorcadion crassipes crassipes Ballion, 1878
 Dorcadion crassipes glazunovi Suvorov, 1910
 Dorcadion crassipes validipes Jakovlev, 1906

See also 
Dorcadion

References

crassipes
Beetles described in 1878